Alastair Norcross is an associate professor of philosophy at the University of Colorado at Boulder, specializing in normative ethics, applied ethics, and political philosophy.  He is a defender of utilitarianism.

Education and career

Norcross graduated from Oxford University in 1983 and earned his Ph.D. at Syracuse University in 1991 under the supervision of Jonathan Bennett.  While finishing his degree, he also taught at Hobart and William Smith Colleges in Geneva, NY from 1990 to 1992.  He then taught for ten years at Southern Methodist University in Dallas, before moving to Rice University in 2002.  He joined the Colorado faculty in 2007.

Philosophical work

In ethics, Norcross defends a version of act utilitarianism known as scalar utilitarianism, which is the theory that there are no right or wrong actions, only better or worse actions ranked along a continuum from the action (or actions) that contributes most to overall utility to the action (or actions) that contributes the least.

On factory farming

In his 2004 paper, Puppies, Pigs, and People: Eating Meat and Marginal Cases, Norcross invoked a thought experiment termed "Fred’s Basement" which argued that consuming factory farmed meat is morally equivalent to torturing and killing puppies because both knowingly cause unnecessary harm to sentient creatures just for trivial pleasures.

Norcross left open the possibility that consuming humanely-raised meat is permissible, whilst some of his readers have contended that his argumentative approach rules it out.

Selected articles

 (2006) 'Scalar Act-Utilitarianism'. In Henry R. West (ed.) Blackwell Guide to Mill's Utilitarianism. 
 (2006) 'Reasons Without Demands: Rethinking Rightness'. In Jamie Dreier (ed.) Contemporary Debates in Moral Theory. 
 (2005) 'Peacemaking Philosophy or Appeasement?  Sterba's Argument for Compromise'. International Journal of Applied Philosophy, 19:2.
 (2005) 'Contextualism for Consequentialists'. Acta Analytica, 20(2).
 (2005) 'Harming in Context'. Philosophical Studies, 123 (1-2).
 (2004) 'Puppies, Pigs, and People: Eating Meat and Marginal Cases'. Philosophical Perspectives 18.
 (2003) 'Killing and Letting Die'. In R. G. Frey and Christopher Heath Wellman (eds.), The Blackwell Companion to Applied Ethics: 451–463.
 (2002) 'Contractualism and Aggregation'. Social Theory and Practice, 28 (2): 303–314.
 (1999) 'Intransitivity and the Person-Affecting Principle'. Philosophy and Phenomenological Research, LIX (3): 769–776.
 (1998) 'Great Harms from Small Benefits Grow: How Death can be Outweighed by Headaches'. Analysis: 152–158.

References

Alastair Norcross's CV (Accessed October 2007)
 Alastair Norcross's home page. (Accessed October 2007)

External links
Interview with What Is It Like to be a Philosopher?

20th-century British philosophers
Year of birth missing (living people)
Living people
American animal rights scholars
American political philosophers
Hobart and William Smith Colleges alumni
Philosophers from Colorado
Philosophers from Texas
Rice University faculty
Southern Methodist University faculty
Syracuse University alumni
University of Colorado faculty
Utilitarians